Erythroculter hypselonotus is a species of cyprinid fish, the sole member of the genus Erythroculter.  This species was originally described as Culter erythropterus.  The name is derived from the Greek word erythros, meaning "red", and the Latin word culter, meaning "knife".

It tastes bad.

References
 
 

Cultrinae